Leprocaulinus is a genus of phasmids belonging to the family Phasmatidae.

The Phasmida Species File lists:

Leprocaulinus digitatus 
Leprocaulinus heinrichi 
Leprocaulinus insularis 
Leprocaulinus kaupii 
Leprocaulinus lobulatus 
Leprocaulinus mammatus 
Leprocaulinus obiensis 
Leprocaulinus sulawesiense 
Leprocaulinus vipera

References

Phasmatodea genera
Lonchodidae